Naa Desam is a 1982 Indian Telugu-language film, produced by K. Devi Vara Prasad and S. Venkataratnam and directed by K. Bapayya. It stars N. T. Rama Rao and Jayasudha, with music composed by Chakravarthy. The film is a remake of the Hindi film Laawaris (1981).

Plot 
Left in the care of an alcoholic Kailasam (Prabhakar Reddy), a young orphan named Bharath wrestles with life at his young age. Years later, now a young man (N. T. Rama Rao), Bharath works for Prathap Rao (Satyanarayana) and is in love with Mohini (Jayasudha), who will not have anything to do with him due to his lack of ancestry. Bharath is determined to find out who his parents are, and the only one who can help him is the elusive, alcohol-induced and incoherent Kailasam.

Cast 

N. T. Rama Rao as Bharath
Jayasudha as Mohini
Satyanarayana as Prathap Rao
Jaggayya
Giribabu as Kumar
Prabhakar Reddy as Kailasam
Allu Ramalingaiah
Padmanabham
Siva Krishna
P. L. Narayana
P. J. Sarma
Suthi Velu
Chalapathi Rao
Jamuna
Kanchana
Rajyalakshmi
Rohini
Silk Smitha
Radha Kumari
Krishnaveni
Kakinada Shymala
Master Harish
Baby Meena

Production 
Principal photography began 22 July 1982 at Ramakrishna Studios, Hyderabad. The song sequences were filmed at Ooty within the span of five days. The shooting of the entire film was completed in 19 days, which was a record. Rama Rao was paid  24 lakh for the film, which was a huge remuneration at the time. This film has a few scenes where Rama Rao did not dub in his own voice which had become hoarse due to addressing a large number of political gatherings; instead Paruchuri Gopalakrishna dubbed for Rama Rao in those scenes.

Soundtrack 
The soundtrack was composed by Chakravarthy, with lyrics by Veturi. It consists of six songs, all of which were written within two days.

References

External links 
Naa Desam at the Internet Movie Database

Telugu remakes of Hindi films
1980s Telugu-language films
1982 films
Films directed by K. Bapayya
Films scored by K. Chakravarthy